Ur-Nanshe also Ur-Nina, was the first king of the First Dynasty of Lagash (approx. 2500 BCE) in the Sumerian Early Dynastic Period III. He is known through inscriptions to have commissioned many buildings projects, including canals and temples, in the state of Lagash, and defending Lagash from its rival state Umma. He was probably not from royal lineage, being the son of Gunidu who was recorded without an accompanying royal title. He was the father of Akurgal, who succeeded him, and grandfather of Eanatum. Eanatum expanded the kingdom of Lagash by defeating Umma as illustrated in the Stele of the Vultures and continue building and renovation of Ur-Nanshe's original buildings.

He ascended after Lugalshaengur (lugal-ša-engur), who was the ensi, or high priest of Lagash, and is only known from the macehead inscription of Mesilim.

Temples
According to the Perforated Relief of King Ur-Nanshe, temples attributed to Ur-Nanshe include Ningirsu's temple in Girsu, Nanshe's temple in Nina, and Apsubanda. He is known to have originally built the Ibgal of Inanna, because of Eanatum's honorary inscriptions left after temple renovation. The Ibgal of Inanna is located in modern-day al-Hiba (ancient city of Lagash). An oval wall surrounds the main mud brick temple and it is located on the southwest edge of the city. This placement within the city is different because temples were usually centrally positioned in ancient Sumer.

Inscriptions

Ur-Nanshe has left behind many inscriptions and plates that depict him, his family, and court.

The Perforated Relief

The Perforated Relief of King Ur-Nanshe is on display at the Louvre. The king is portrayed as a builder of temples and canals, thus a preserver of order perceived to be bestowed upon them by the gods. It is a perforated limestone slab that was probably part of a wall as a votive decoration and is inscribed in Sumerian:

The carved illustration is in two registers, top and bottom, both depicting Ur-Nanshe in different roles as king. In the top register he is dressed in a kaunakes (tufted wool skirt), carrying a basket of bricks on his head while surrounded by other Lagash elite, his wife, and seven of his sons (though it is possible female figure is instead the king's daughter). Inscriptions on their respective garments identify each person. On the bottom register, Ur-Nanshe is at a banquet, which is to celebrate the building of the temple. He is seated on a throne wearing the same outfit as the top register surrounded by other court members. In both registers Ur-Nanshe is shown using hierarchical proportion in which he is considerably larger than everyone surrounding him.

A part of the inscriptions, in front of the seated king, reads: “Boats from the (distant) land of Dilmun carried the wood (for him)”. This is the oldest known written record of Dilmun and importation of goods into Mesopotamia.

Door socket

An inscribed door socket from Ur-Nanshe is also known, now in the Louvre Museum. The full inscription of the door socket has been translated as:

The Plaque of Ur Nanshe

The Plaque of Ur Nanshe is a limestone plaque currently located at the Louvre Museum that honors Ur Nanshe. The figures displayed are the king and his court standing rigid and wide eyed, paying homage to the god Nanshe. They are dressed in kaunakes with their hands clasped together over their chest. Hierarchical scale of the king and the use of cuneiform on the figures to identify them are employed as in the Perforated Relief.

Additional inscriptions

There are many other inscriptions found by or mentioning Ur-Nanshe. Some of them include a listing of rulers of Lagash and a Hymn to Nashe.

Excerpt from Ruler of Lagash:

“Ur-Nanše, the son of ......, who built the E-Sirara, her temple of happiness and Niĝin, her beloved city, acted for 1080 years. Ane-tum, the son of Ur-Nanše”

Excerpt from A Hymn to Nashe:

“There is perfection in the presence of the lady. Lagaš thrives in abundance in the presence of Nanše. She chose the šennu in her holy heart and seated Ur-Nanše, the beloved lord of Lagaš, on the throne. She gave the lofty scepter to the shepherd.”

See also

History of Sumer
Chronology of the ancient Near East

References

Kings of Lagash
25th-century BC Sumerian kings